Benjamin Jason Parris is an American author, educator, and museum planner best known as the creator of Wade of Aquitaine.  As an educator and technology consultant, he has won national awards.  In their August 19, 2005 edition, Long Island Business News placed Ben Parris in the Top Ten of their Who's Who in Technology list.

Education 

Ben Parris graduated from Abraham Lincoln High School in Brooklyn; did coursework in English from Columbia University in the 1980s; received his B.S. in Accounting from Brooklyn College in 1983; graduated from the U.S. Treasury Department's Advanced Business Communications program in 1985; and received his M.S. in Computer Science from Brooklyn College in 1987, passing his CPA exam in the same year.

Biography 

After college, Parris became a tax expert and technology consultant in preparation for a career in museum administration.

At the United States Department of Treasury, he co-created with Juan Rivera the first procedures and public contact training program for Taxpayer Service Division in 1985, originating in Brooklyn District.  This was used as the national model after 1987.  Also in 1985 at Treasury, he implemented the pilot program for the nation's first semi-automated telephone information system known as TeleTax.  It is fully automated at this time.  In 1990, he wrote the first in-house financial statement software for Deloitte Touche Tohmatsu.

As the executive director of the Long Island Museum of Science & Technology, Ben Parris led the organization in partnership with Nassau Technology Educators and Long Island University to the Unisys Prize for Online Science Education in 2002. His methods became the subject of a best practices seminar at the American Association for the Advancement of Science.

Parris conceived an annual astronomy day at Long Island's Museums at Mitchel brought two Sky & Telescope Astronomy Day Awards in 2005: Overall Winner, and Best New Idea for the team of Long Island Museum of Science and Technology, Nassau County Firefighter's Museum and Education Center, and Cradle of Aviation Museum preceded by Honorable Mention for a larger team in 2003.

In his program for disadvantaged students at Alverta B. Gray Schultz Middle School in Hempstead, New York, he devised a method for scaling classic school science experiments up to real-world engineering budgets and materials.  This technique was widely disseminated and became standard practice in several of Long Island's leading schools.

Parris has been an educator for NASA in the Solar System Ambassador Program since its inception in 2002, and was periodically engaged by NASA TV to help train its management and consulting scientists and engineers in media exposure.

Author 

Ben Parris incorporates his science fiction and fantasy heroes with his own afflictions discovering even greater strengths emerging to compensate for their original limitations.  At a young age, Ben Parris battled severe dyscalculia to tackle physics and calculus. Themes also include astral projection, and the multiverse.  His work is influenced by Edgar Rice Burroughs, Stephen R. Donaldson, John E. Stith, Orson Scott Card, Arthur C. Clarke, Nancy Kress, Ursula K. Le Guin, Anne McCaffrey, and Kurt Vonnegut, Jr.

Novels 
 Wade of Aquitaine 
 Mars Armor Forged 
 Kreindia of Amorium

Non-fiction 

A one-time columnist for Scholastic Administrator, a publication of Scholastic Corporation, Parris has published a variety of articles and award-winning short stories on music, science, education and business as well as humor.  The most cited of his short works is "The Other Mr. Nedzi."  In addition to a Wade of Aquitaine sequel, he is currently working on a book about fundraising called The Nonprofit Breadwinner.

References

External links
Ben Parris Official Website
Long Island Museum of Science and Technology
Astronomical League
Franklin Institute
NASA TV
American Association for the Advancement of Science

1961 births
21st-century American novelists
American male novelists
American science fiction writers
American fantasy writers
Novelists from New York (state)
Living people
21st-century American male writers
Abraham Lincoln High School (Brooklyn) alumni
Columbia University alumni
Brooklyn College alumni